Harper (released in the UK as The Moving Target) is a 1966 American mystery film based on Ross Macdonald's 1949 novel The Moving Target and adapted for the screen by novelist William Goldman, who admired MacDonald's writings. The film stars Paul Newman as Lew Harper (Lew Archer in the novel), and was directed by Jack Smight, with a cast that includes Robert Wagner, Julie Harris, Janet Leigh, Shelley Winters, Lauren Bacall, and Arthur Hill.

The film pays homage to Humphrey Bogart's portrayals of Sam Spade and Philip Marlowe by featuring Lauren Bacall, Bogart's widow, who plays a wounded wife searching for her missing husband, a role similar to General Sternwood in the 1946 Bogart-and-Bacall film The Big Sleep.

Goldman received a 1967 Edgar Award for Best Motion Picture Screenplay. In 1975, Newman reprised his role in The Drowning Pool.

Plot
Private investigator Lew Harper skips the appointment to sign his divorce papers when asked to search for multi-millionaire Ralph Sampson, who has disappeared after flying into Los Angeles. Sampson’s wife Elaine is physically disabled and wants to be sure he is not squandering the fortune she hopes to inherit. Harper interviews Allan Taggert, Sampson’s private pilot, and his flirtatious daughter Miranda. An old photo of a glamorous starlet in Sampson's bungalow leads Harper to Fay Estabrook, now an aging alcoholic. Harper gets her drunk to see if she is connected to Sampson's disappearance. When she passes out, he encounters the armed Dwight Troy, Fay's husband, who falls for Harper's cover story that he is just a lovesick fan of the former star.

Having intercepted a call at Fay’s, Harper tracks down Betty Fraley, a lounge singer. When he asks about the missing Ralph, she recognizes his voice and has the bouncer Puddler take him out to beat him in a back alley, but Taggert arrives and knocks Puddler unconscious. Taggert then joins Harper as they head back to Troy's house to check on the truck Betty warned Fay to head off on the phone. Harper leaves Taggert standing watch outside, but the truck is warned off and gets away when Taggert shoots at it, though it leaves distinctive tire marks in the dust.

Elaine now receives a message from Ralph, asking her to cash in $500,000 worth of bonds and Harper deduces that he has been kidnapped. Driving to a remote mountaintop property that Sampson previously had given to Claude, a bogus holy man for his cult's temple, Harper evades attempts to distract him and finds a huge kettle of beans cooking, as well as the familiar tire prints.

Back at the Sampson estate, Harper finds a ransom note with instructions to drop the cash that night outside town. Harper sends Taggert and Albert Graves, Sampson’s attorney, to deliver the cash while he keeps watch. During the ransom drop, the man picking up the money is shot dead and the cash is taken by someone in a white convertible. A matchbook on the body leads Harper to The Corner, a seedy bar where Harper charms the barmaid into revealing that the dead man was Eddie, a regular customer who had made a long-distance call from the bar three nights before. Outside, Harper spots Puddler driving the truck that earlier escaped him, which he follows back to Claude’s temple. There he uncovers a smuggling operation of illegal immigrant labor run by Troy. Harper is caught and questioned by Troy, who knows nothing of the kidnapping or Eddie's part in it but realizes the white convertible belongs to Betty Fraley.

When Puddler takes Harper to a dockside location, Harper manages to escape and kill the pursuing Puddler. Harper suspects that it was Taggert, Betty, and her brother Eddie who kidnapped Sampson. When questioned, Taggert pulls a gun on Harper but is shot by Graves, who arrives just in time. Harper then goes looking for Betty at her cottage and hears her being tortured by Troy, Claude and Fay. Harper bursts in when she reveals where the money is hidden, shoots Troy and slugs Claude unconscious; locking Fay in a closet, he helps Betty to escape. When Harper tells Betty that Taggert, her secret lover is dead, she reveals that Sampson is being held in an abandoned oil tanker. Harper calls Graves to meet them there but, as Harper searches the ship, he is knocked unconscious from behind. Sometime later Graves revives Harper and they discover that Sampson has recently been killed. Meanwhile, Betty has driven off in Harper's car and, as they pursue her along a hillside road, she is killed when the car swerves down an incline.

Harper and Graves retrieve the money and Graves drives Harper home. On the way, Harper tells Graves he knows he was the crooks’ secret partner and killed Sampson. Harper tells Graves that he has no choice but to turn him in and that Graves will have to shoot him to stop him. But when Harper gets out and walks to his front door, Graves cannot bring himself to shoot and Harper raises his arms in resignation.

Cast

Production

Development
William Goldman had written the novel Boys and Girls Together, the film rights to which had been optioned by producer Elliot Kastner. Kastner met with Goldman and expressed a desire to make a tough movie, one "with balls". Goldman suggested the Lew Archer novels of Ross Macdonald would be ideal – Goldman had long been an admirer of Macdonald, saying the Archer books were "the finest series of detective novels ever written by an American" and that Macdonald was "one of the best American novelists now operating, and he keeps getting better."

Goldman offered to do an adaptation. Kastner agreed, saying he would option whatever of the novels Goldman suggested. Goldman chose The Moving Target, the first novel. Kastner later said he paid Macdonald $1,000 for the film rights and Goldman $5,000 to do the script.

According to Goldman, the script was offered first to Frank Sinatra, who turned it down, then to Paul Newman, who was eager to accept as he had just made the costume film Lady L, and he was keen to do something contemporary. Newman's signing was announced in March 1965. Kastner set up the film at Warner Bros for a budget of $3.3 million of which Kastner got $500,000.

The script originally was called Archer. The name of the lead character was changed from Lew Archer to Harper because the producers had not bought the rights to the series, just to The Moving Target. Goldman later wrote "so we needed a different name and Harper seemed OK, the guy harps on things, it's essentially what he does for a living." Goldman says Newman wanted a title with the letter H as he had good luck with one word titles starting with "H" such as The Hustler and Hud.

"It's a Bogie kind of film", said Newman, adding the difference in the private eye character "is the level of commitment. He has more of a sense of humor about his job."

Jack Smight
Goldman says the film originally was offered to a director who was engaged in a legal fight with Warners. The job eventually went to Jack Smight, best known then for his TV work, who had recently signed a six-picture deal with Warner Bros. The Third Day (1965) was the first and Harper was to be the second.

According to Smight, Paul Newman had admired some of the director's work for live TV. The director met with Newman, discussed the script, and received the star's approval. In contrast with his first two features, Smight loved the script for Harper.

Smight later said "attempting a private eye story at the height of all these Bonds could have been a risky business. We wanted to capture some of the qualities of Double Indemnity and all those earlier Raymond Chandlers and Hammetts – in other words to do a really good movie movie – without being accused of retrogressing. I studied some of those pictures to see what made them tick. One great thing they had going for them was that the character people were so visually explicit: When Peter Lorre or Sydney Greenstreet walked in on Bogart, you didn't need an explanation. Today it's harder to find them; they just aren't being developed in the way they used to be."

Smight asked for, and got, rehearsal time for the movie.

Shooting
In the title sequence, Newman dunks his head into a sinkful of ice cubes to rouse himself awake; a bit that he repeated in the 1973 film The Sting. Newman reportedly followed this routine every morning in real life.

Robert Wagner later recalled Jack Smight "lacked confidence; his wife was with him on the set for the entire shoot and seemed to function as a kind of security blanket. This was annoying because a film set derives its specific temperature from the star and the director. Our director was nervous, which can make the cast and crew nervous. But Paul pretended not to notice and his confidence spread to the rest of the cast. The reason he was confident was because William Goldman's script was tight and amusing and the cast kept things bubbling."

Reception
The film was a hit at the box office. It launched Goldman's career as a screenwriter.

Awards and nominations

Box office
The film earned $5.3 million in North American rentals in 1966.

Sequel
Goldman adapted The Chill, another Macdonald novel, for the same producers, but it was not filmed. Paul Newman pulled out of the project, and Sam Peckinpah became attached as director for a while as the film was set up at Commonwealth United Entertainment. When that company ended its film operations, it was not made.

The Drowning Pool (1950), another Macdonald novel, was adapted to film with Paul Newman reprising the role of Harper. The Drowning Pool was released by Warner Brothers in 1975.

See also
 List of American films of 1966

References

External links
 
 
 
 
 

1966 films
1960s mystery films
American detective films
American mystery films
American neo-noir films
Films about missing people
Films based on American novels
Films based on mystery novels
Edgar Award-winning works
Films set in California
Warner Bros. films
Films directed by Jack Smight
Films with screenplays by William Goldman
Films scored by Johnny Mandel
Films produced by Elliott Kastner
1960s English-language films
1960s American films